Canton Middle School may refer to one or more of the following:

Canton Middle School - Haywood County, North Carolina
Canton Middle School - Baltimore, Maryland
Canton Middle School - Streamwood, Illinois